The Marquis is an American independent comic book series written and illustrated by Guy Davis, released by Caliber Comics, Oni Press and Dark Horse Comics.

Publication history
The Marquis was originally published by Caliber Comics where the Les Preludes issue  appeared in 1997, followed by the rest of the Danse Macabre series from Oni Comics in 2000. This was followed by a one-shot and a two-issue miniseries in 2002–2003. Davis will be finishing the story he started at Dark Horse Comics, where he was working on B.P.R.D. from 2003 to 2011. He said:

The ultimate plan was to make The Marquis a five-volume series. The first volume, Inferno collects the trade paperbacks Danse Macabre and Intermezzo. Davis plans to release the rest as graphic novels, starting with The Marquis and the Midwife and then two more that finish the Marquis' story, followed by a final prequel volume. A one-shot prequel to Danse Macabre, titled The Marquis and the Coachman, was published in MySpace/Dark Horse Presents #22 (2009).

Plot
The Marquis takes place in Venisalle, a fictional land resembling France during the mid-18th century, complete with stratified society and Church dominance of everyday affairs. The story revolves around Vol de Galle, a former Inquisitor of The Faith who has the ability to see demons, many of which have infiltrated society disguised in human form. De Galle combats these entities with his sabre and a pair of specially built, anachronistic machine guns.

Reception
While ostensibly a horror-action comic, The Marquis analyses personal and religious issues through the conflicted character of de Galle, and has been received well by critics and comics professionals including Mike Mignola and Stan Sakai for both its content and Davis's detailed and disturbing artwork.

Collected editions
To date, two trade paperbacks have been released by Oni Press and one volume collecting all prior material published by Dark Horse.

Notes

References

External links
The Marquis series on the Oni Press site
Guy Davis' page on the series
The Marquis Inferno, Guy Davis' Marquis blog

Oni Press titles
Dark Horse Comics titles
Horror comics
Fantasy comics
2000 comics debuts
2002 comics endings
Comics set in the 18th century